Afzal Ali was a medieval Bengali poet. He is best known for his magnum opus, Nasihatnama. Abdul Karim Sahitya Bisharad claims that he belongs to the 16th-century, although Banglapedia places him in the 17th century.

Early life and family
Afzal Ali was born into a Bengali Muslim family from the village of Milua in present-day Satkania, Chittagong District. His father was known as Bhangu Faqir.

Career
Afzal Ali was known to have written Nasihatnama (নসীহতনামা) around 1662 C.E., as well as Padabali, which were a few verses written in Vaishnava style. The former is a notable Muslim literary work of Bengal as only few Islamic have been found in Bengali during that period. The book contains references to sermons in simple language, and Ali had a good reputation as a writer. Many Bengali authors wrote books titled "Nasihatnama", with the next-known poet being Sheikh Paran (1550-1615).

References

Bengali-language poets
Bengali Muslims
Bengali-language writers
17th-century Bengalis
People from Satkania Upazila
Bengali male poets
16th-century Bengali poets
16th-century Indian Muslims
People from Chittagong District